Chamaerhodos  is a genus of plants in the family Rosaceae

Species
 Chamaerhodos altaica (Laxm.) Bunge
 Chamaerhodos canescens J.Krause
 Chamaerhodos corymbosa Murav.
 Chamaerhodos erecta (L.) Bunge
 Chamaerhodos grandiflora (Pall. ex Schult.) Bunge
 Chamaerhodos sabulosa Bunge
 Chamaerhodos trifida Ledeb.

References

External links

Potentilleae
Rosaceae genera
Taxa named by Alexander von Bunge